Oligoryzomys flavescens, also known as the flavescent colilargo or yellow pygmy rice rat is a species of rodent in the genus Oligoryzomys of family Cricetidae. It is found in southern South America, occurring in southern Brazil, Paraguay, Uruguay, and northeastern Argentina. Its karyotype has 2n = 64-66 and FNa = 66-70.

Description
The dorsal fur of Oligoryzomys flavescens consists of bright orangish-brown hairs mixed with blackish hairs, the hairs on the flanks are all orange and the underparts are yellowish-grey. The boundary between the upper parts and the underparts is indistinct, grading from one colour to the other. The head-and-body length averages  and the tails averages . Skull features that distinguish this species include the long incisive foramina (openings in the hard palate) that usually reach the first molar, and the short mesopterygoid fossa (a depression behind the end of the palate) which does not extend as far as the third molar.

Distribution
O. flavescens is native to South America. It occurs in eastern Brazil, Uruguay, eastern Paraguay and northern and central Argentina. These include pampas, scrubland, primary and secondary forests, marshes, agricultural land, and gallery forests in the cerrado.

Ecology
O. flavescens is the principal reservoir host of certain hantaviruses, which are harmless to rodents but cause disease in humans.

Status
The International Union for Conservation of Nature has rated the conservation status of O. flavescens as being of "least concern". This is on the basis that it has a wide range, is presumed to have a large total population, occurs in several protected areas and tolerates some degree of disturbance to its habitat.

References

Literature cited

Weksler, M., Bonvicino, C., D'Elia, G., Pardinas, U. Teta, P. and Jayat, J.P. 2008. . In IUCN. IUCN Red List of Threatened Species. Version 2009.2. <www.iucnredlist.org>. Downloaded on 5 September 2015.

Oligoryzomys
Mammals described in 1837
Taxa named by George Robert Waterhouse